Alex Dyke (born 19 February 1962) is an English broadcaster and radio presenter on BBC Radio Solent.

Career

1970s
Dyke started life as a DJ at Shanklin Youth Club in January 1975 at the age of 12. At 16, Dyke had managed to gain work at several night clubs on the Isle of Wight even though he was legally under-aged.

1980s
By the early 1980s, Dyke was working at youth clubs in the South with some of the top chart stars of the day. He presented showbiz interviews at Portsmouth's local commercial radio station Radio Victory before joining BBC Radio Solent in early 1984 to help out on their youth show Something Else.
  
In 1985, Dyke joined Radio Luxembourg at their Mayfair studios in London taking control of future programme ideas and recording specials and documentaries. In 1986, Dyke moved closer to home to start work at a new station, Ocean Sound where he fronted late nights, afternoons and Drive Time until 1991. During the 1980s and 1990s he also presented shows for Northsound Radio in Scotland, Nova The Power FM and Contact 94 in France.

1990s
In 1990, as part of the ITV Telethon whilst at Ocean Sound, Dyke broadcast a 27-hour non-stop radio show from the TVS television studios in Southampton and was featured in the TV coverage for this event. In 1991, he joined Isle of Wight Radio to present the Midmorning show and in 1992 introduced the daily phone-in which he presented for the next 17 years.

2000s
By the year 2000, 30% of the calls to the daily phone-in came from the UK mainland. His mid-morning show was networked to sister station The Quay in Portsmouth and he co-presented the late night radio show North South Divided with Mike Elliott ("Mike The Mouth") across all 28 radio stations in The Local Radio Company.

After living in the United States for a year in 2009 and presenting programmes in Orlando for News radio 1190am and ESPN 1080am, Dyke returned to the UK to work for BBC Radio Solent.

2010s
In 2012 Alex joined BBC South Today and over the next 8 years made a series of short films about Rock and Pop in the South including reports on the Beatles the Rolling Stones and Tom Jones. Plus he reported live from various festivals including the Isle of Wight Festival.

In 2016 Dyke created the new afternoon show for BBC Radio Solent - The Afternoon Wall Of Sound. Live sessions came from acts as diverse as the Zombies and Rick Astley.

Dyke currently presents the Wall of Sound on BBC Radio Solent on Friday evenings 6 til 10 and Bubblegum and Cheese on Saturday.

2020s 
Dyke along with radio producer Tom Stroud created the podcast Stars Cars Guitars. A weekly get together with Spandau Ballet singer Tony Hadley and guitarist Jim Cregan. The Podcast hit the top of the Apple charts in just five weeks.

In December 2020 a Christmas TV show of the podcast was broadcast on Talking Pictures TV.

Bubblegum and Cheese
Artists such as Mud, Slade, Showaddywaddy, David Cassidy, Donny Osmond, The Monkees and The Hollies are often featured on the radio show Bubblegum and Cheese.  It began in 2005 when Dyke was asked to present an extra show at weekends. The programme quickly went from being broadcast on just one radio station to 20 stations in The Local Radio Company network. In 2010 Bubblegum and Cheese moved to BBC Solent where it ran until being axed in 2021. Bubblegum and Cheese now plays for short spells on Express FM, Portsmouth. In 2011, Dyke took Bubblegum and Cheese on the road, and now tours with artists and plays at various large-scale events across the country.

Television work
Dyke presented a short series for ITV Meridian called People Power and has guested several times on ITV's The Time and the Place. He presented an American Chart Show for the now defunct Solent TV who also used to film his daily lunchtime phone-in which he hosted for Isle of Wight Radio. The phone-in received cult status when picked up by a Sky TV channel. Martin Lee at London's LBC Radio said "It's car crash radio on train crash TV."

References

External links
 BBC Radio Solent profile
 Official Stars Cars Guitars website

1962 births
Living people
English radio presenters
People from Shanklin